The Au Pairs were a British post-punk band that formed in Birmingham in 1978 and continued until 1983.  They produced two studio albums and three singles.  Their songs were said to have "contempt for the cliches of contemporary sexual politics" and their music has been compared to that of the Gang of Four and the Young Marble Giants. The band was led by Lesley Woods, who was once described as "one of the most striking women in British rock".

Career
Au Pairs formed in Birmingham in 1978. Their first album, Playing with a Different Sex, is considered a post-punk classic, with strong, sarcastic songs such as "It's Obvious" and "We're So Cool" taking a dry look at gender relations. Other songs, such as "Armagh"—with its refrain, "we don't torture"—criticized the British government's treatment of Irish Republican prisoners during the troubles in Northern Ireland.

In 1980 the band were filmed live for the concert film Urgh! A Music War.

The band's second album, Sense and Sensuality (1982), showed a greater influence of jazz, soul, funk and disco on the band's sound, but was less well received.

Following the departure of Jane Munro in 1983, the band recruited Nick O'Connor who also played piano and synthesizers. At this time the group were further augmented by Jayne Morris (percussion and backing vocals), Graeme Hamilton (trumpet) and Cara Tivey on additional keyboards.  The band were scheduled to record a third album with producer Steve Lillywhite in 1983 but broke up. Woods has intimated that the hostility and violence she and other women faced playing music was a factor in the group's demise: "There comes a point where you can’t go on any more at that level," she told Nige Tassell of The Guardian.

Woods formed an all-woman band called the Darlings in the late 1980s, but then left the music industry. Now, as Lesley Longhurst-Woods, she works as a lawyer in London. Guitarist Paul Foad published a guitar technique book, co-written with Stuart Ritchie, titled The Caged Guitarist (2000). Bass player Jane Munro works as an alternative therapist (aromatherapy, reflexology and Indian head massage) in Birmingham. Pete Hammond also remains an active musician and teaches percussion in Birmingham.

Reception
In a review of the band's debut show at the Whisky a Go Go, critic Richard Cromelin said: "When the crowd at the Whisky kept calling Au Pairs back to the stage for encores Wednesday night, it was as if they were trying to tell the group's singer Lesley Woods that her band had done just fine and she could go ahead and loosen up a little." (Los Angeles Times, 1981)

Writing about their show at The Ritz, John Rockwell said "The Au Pairs blend political lyrics, a tough, funk-dance-rock idiom and an at least initially dispassionate vocal style, rather like the Gang of Four meeting the Young Marble Giants" and suggested that Lesley Woods "and the band were able to build the insinuating monotones of the songs early in the set through street taunts into a rousing rock-and-roll climax." (The New York Times, 1981)

Music historian Gillian G. Gaar noted in her 2002 She's a Rebel: The History of Women in Rock and Roll (Live Girls) that the band mingled male and female musicians in a revolutionary collaborative way, as part of its outspoken explorations of sexual politics.

Discography

Albums
Playing with a Different Sex (Human Records, HUMAN 1, 1981) (No. 33 UK)
Sense and Sensuality (Kamera Records, KAM 010, 1982) (No. 79 UK)

Singles
"You" / "Domestic Departure" / "Kerb Crawler" (021 Records, OTO 2, 1979)
"It's Obvious" / "Diet" (021 Records, OTO 4, 1980) (No. 37 on the US Billboard Club Play Singles charts)
"Inconvenience" / "Pretty Boys" (Human Records, HUM 8, 1981)
"Inconvenience" / "Pretty Boys" / "Headache For Michelle" (remix) (Human Records, HUM 8/12, 1981)

Live and compilation albums
Live in Berlin (AKA Records, AKA6, recorded 1982, released 1983)
Shocks to the System: The Very Best of the Au Pairs (Cherry Red, CDMRED161, 1999)
Equal But Different - BBC Sessions 79-81 (RPM, RPM139)
Stepping Out of Line: The Anthology (Castle Music, CMQDD1338, released May 2006 in the UK)
 Equally Different. Live in Berlin, 1981, Suffragette Production SP 27 (bootleg)

Original members
Lesley Woods - guitar/vocals
Paul Foad - guitar/vocals
Jane Munro - bass
Pete Hammond - drums

Other members (1983)
 Nick O'Connor - bass/keyboards/backing vocals
 Graeme Hamilton - trumpet
 Jayne Morris - percussion/backing vocals
 Cara Tivey - additional keyboards

References

External links

Photos of the band
VH1 page on the band
Au Pairs Trouser Press Guide.

English post-punk music groups
Musical groups from Birmingham, West Midlands
Musical groups established in 1979
Musical groups disestablished in 1983
Political music groups